Kobuk is a city in Northwest Arctic Borough, Alaska, United States. At the 2010 census the population was 151, up from 109 in 2000.

History
Kobuk was founded in 1899 as the village of Shungnak, a supply point for miners north of the Kobuk River in the Cosmos Hills. A trading post, school, and mission were built and residents came to the settlement. In the 1920s, river erosion led many residents to relocate ten miles downstream (west) to a site called "Kochuk." Kochuk became the new Shungnak, while the original Shungnak became Kobuk in 1928.

In May 1973, a flood covered the entire village. In September of the same year, it incorporated as a city.

The economy of Kobuk is based on subsistence hunting for caribou and moose.

The first postmaster at Kobuk (when it was still called Shungnak) was Martin F. Moran, appointed September 24, 1903.

Geography and climate
Kobuk has a typical subarctic climate (Köppen climate classification: Dfc), bordering on a dry-winter subarctic climate (Köppen climate classification: Dwc).

Kobuk is located at  (66.917579, -156.906829).

It is near Kobuk Valley National Park.

Demographics

Kobuk first appeared on the 1910 U.S. Census under its previous name of Shungnak, an unincorporated village. It appeared again on the 1920 U.S. Census. With the departure of many residents in 1927 to the "New" Shungnak site, the old site was renamed Kobuk in 1928. It did not appear on the 1930 census, but did beginning again in 1940. In 1970, Kobuk was erroneously reported as the unincorporated "Shungnak Village" (not to be confused with its neighbor city). In 1973, Kobuk was formally incorporated and has reported as Kobuk in every successive census since 1980.

As of the census of 2000, there were 109 people, 26 households, and 23 families residing in the city. The population density was 6.8 people per square mile (2.6/km2). There were 45 housing units at an average density of 2.8 per square mile (1.1/km2). The racial makeup of the city was 4.59% White, 93.58% Native American, 0.92% Asian, 0.92% from other races. 4.59% of the population were Hispanic or Latino of any race.

There were 26 households, out of which 61.5% had children under the age of 18 living with them, 46.2% were married couples living together, 30.8% had a female householder with no husband present, and 11.5% were non-families. 11.5% of all households were made up of individuals, and none had someone living alone who was 65 years of age or older. The average household size was 4.19 and the average family size was 4.26.

In the city, the age distribution of the population shows 52.3% under the age of 18, 9.2% from 18 to 24, 18.3% from 25 to 44, 17.4% from 45 to 64, and 2.8% who were 65 years of age or older. The median age was 17 years. For every 100 females, there were 98.2 males. For every 100 females age 18 and over, there were 100.0 males.

The median income for a household in the city was $30,750, and the median income for a family was $20,313. Males had a median income of $71,250 versus $21,875 for females. The per capita income for the city was $9,844. There were 32.0% of families and 28.6% of the population living below the poverty line, including 28.2% of under eighteens and 57.1% of those over 64.

Education
The Kobuk School, operated by the Northwest Arctic Borough School District, serves the community.  it had 44 students, with Alaska Natives making up 100% of the student body.

References

Cities in Alaska
Cities in Northwest Arctic Borough, Alaska
Mining communities in Alaska
Populated places of the Arctic United States